Church of Saint Michael the Archangel of Ladomirová is a Greek-catholic church situated in the village of Ladomirová.

History 
An earlier church is believed to be existed in this place in 1600.
The current church was constructed in wood in 1742. On July 7, 2008, the church along with seven other monuments was declared UNESCO world heritage site under the name "Wooden Churches of the Slovak part of the Carpathian Mountain Area".

References 

Wooden churches
World Heritage Sites in Slovakia
Slovak Greek Catholic churches
Wooden buildings and structures in Slovakia
18th-century Roman Catholic church buildings in Slovakia
Churches completed in 1742